Roberta Silva (born 1971, in Trinidad and Tobago) is an artist based in Milan and Lake Garda.

Silva attended the Brera Academy of Fine Art where she graduated in 1995. She works mainly with sculpture, installation and site-specific interventions.

References

External links
Roberta Silva on ArtFacts.net
Images, texts and biography from the Saatchi Gallery
Roberta Silva at Union-Gallery.com
Roberta Silva at Galleria Francesca Kaufmann
Official website

20th-century Italian sculptors
Italian women sculptors
Italian contemporary artists
Living people
1971 births
Artists from Milan
People from Tobago
Brera Academy alumni
Trinidad and Tobago women sculptors
Trinidad and Tobago sculptors
21st-century Italian sculptors
20th-century women artists
21st-century women artists
20th-century Italian women
21st-century Italian women